Bujakh may refer to:
 Bujakh, West Azerbaijan